Peter Vecsey may refer to:

Peter, Freiherr von Vecsey (died 1809), Austrian Imperial Baron and General officer
Peter Vecsey (sports columnist) (born 1943), American sports columnist